The 2017 Youth Parapan American Games were a multi-sport event held from March 20 March 25, 2017 in São Paulo, Brazil. They were the fourth edition of the Youth Parapan American Games and they were organized by the Brazilian Paralympic Committee (CPB) and the International Paralympic Committee (IPC).

Organization

Venues

All competitive events were held at the Paralympic Training Centre. The opening and closing ceremonies took place in the Exhibition Pavilion of the Anhembi Convention Center.

Mascot 

The mascot of the São Paulo 2017 Youth Parapan American Games was a Mona ("monkey" in Spanish), a female howler monkey, a species native to the São Paulo Atlantic Forest. The name chosen by popular vote, held on the Brazilian Paralympic Committee's Facebook page.

The Games

Participating nations

Sports

Calendar

Medals table 

Source: Sao Paulo Official Results Book

References

External links
 

Sport in São Paulo
Multi-sport events in Brazil
Youth Parapan American Games
Parapan
Parapan
Para